Iain Coleman (born 18 January 1958) was the Labour Member of Parliament for Hammersmith and Fulham in London from 1997 to 2005. He was elected as a councillor in the London Borough of Hammersmith and Fulham for Shepherd's Bush Green ward in May 2010 but has since retired.

Coleman was educated at Tonbridge School. He worked as a local government officer in the London Boroughs of Ealing and Islington. His mother and brother were councillors in Barnet and Westminster respectively.

Coleman was a councillor on Hammersmith and Fulham Council 1986–97, serving as Leader from 1991 to 1996 and Mayor from 1996 to 1997. When Chief Whip of the Labour Group, he resigned over service cuts.
He was first elected as an MP in the 1997 general election, and retained the highly marginal seat at the 2001 general election.

He announced on 14 March 2005, that he would not be contesting the May 2005 general election, due to ill health. Melanie Smallman was subsequently selected by the local Constituency Labour Party to replace him as candidate but was unsuccessful, losing to Greg Hands of the Conservative Party. Coleman subsequently stood for Labour in the May 2006 local election for the North End ward, but failed to gain a seat, the Conservatives making a clean sweep of the ward. However he was elected as a councillor for Shepherds Bush Green ward at the May 2010 local elections.

Coleman is married to Sally Powell, formerly a senior Labour councillor in Hammersmith and Fulham, as well as a NEC member; they have one son, Jack Coleman. Iain is also an Arsenal supporter.

References

External links
BBC Politics - Ill-health forces out Labour MP
 Hammersmith & Fulham Labour Party
 

1958 births
Living people
Labour Party (UK) MPs for English constituencies
Councillors in the London Borough of Hammersmith and Fulham
UK MPs 1997–2001
UK MPs 2001–2005
People educated at Tonbridge School